Aframomum atewae is a monocotyledonous plant species described by John Michael Lock and J.B. Hall. Aframomum atewae is part of the genus Aframomum and the family Zingiberaceae.

The species' range is in Ghana. No subspecies are listed in the Catalog of Life.

References 

atewae
Flora of Ghana